Ripken is a surname. Notable people with the surname include:

Billy Ripken (born 1964), American baseball player
Cal Ripken Jr. (born 1960), American baseball player
Cal Ripken Sr. (1935–1999), American baseball coach and manager, father of Billy and Cal Jr.

See also
Ricken